To the Public Danger is a 1948 British drama short film directed by Terence Fisher and produced by John Croydon. It stars Dermot Walsh, Susan Shaw, Barry Letts, and Frederick Piper.

The film was made at Highbury Studios as a second feature for release by the Rank Organisation. Like other Highbury productions, it offered acting opportunities for several of Rank's young contract stars. The film's sets were designed by Don Russell, although a number of the scenes were shot on location.

The screenplay, written by T.J. Morrison and Arthur Reid, was based on a 1939 radio play by Patrick Hamilton, who had been encouraged to write the story as part of a government road safety campaign. Hamilton had himself been knocked down by a drunk driver. The story was updated slightly, and represents the post-war malaise with the use of noirish sequences. After making the film Fisher graduated to directing several more expensive productions for Gainsborough Pictures.

Synopsis
While having a quiet drink together in a road house, a young working-class couple Fred and Nancy fall into the company of two raffish motorists including the self-confident Captain Cole. After a game of billiards and a number of drinks, they drive out on the road. While speeding along in the dark they hit what they think to be a man on a bicycle.

Although Fred wants to stop, Captain Cole insists on driving on. Nancy takes Cole's side and begins taunting Fred, who eventually manages to escape and raise the alarm. A police investigation reveals that nobody had been injured in the collision with the bike, which had belonged to a poacher who didn't report the accident. In the meantime, Cole, Nancy and the other passenger have suffered a crash of their own while drunken speeding, killing all three of them.

Cast
 Dermot Walsh as Captain Cole  
 Susan Shaw as Nancy Bedford  
 Barry Letts as Fred Lane  
 Roy Plomley as Reggie  
 Betty Ann Davies as Barmaid  
 Sydney Bromley as Bar patron  
 John Lorrell as Police Sergeant  
 Sam Kydd as Police Driver  
 Patricia Hayes as Postmistress  
 Frederick Piper as Labourer  
 Patience Rentoul as Labourer's Wife 
 Cliff Weir as Pub Landlord  
 Arthur Mullard as Man Standing Near Bar 
 Barbara Murray as Bit Role  
 Philip Saville as Man in pub watching billiards game 
 Constance Smith as Girl in pub watching billiards game

References

Bibliography
 Chibnall, Steve & McFarlane, Brian. The British 'B' Film. Palgrave MacMillan, 2009.
 Hutchings, Peter. Terence Fisher. Manchester University Press, 2001.

External links

1948 films
British drama films
1948 drama films
Films set in England
Films directed by Terence Fisher
Films shot at Highbury Studios
British black-and-white films
1940s English-language films
1940s British films